Jim Blasingame is an American small business expert, radio talk show host, author, syndicated columnist, keynote speaker, and president of Small Business Network, Inc., a media company serving small business. He is the creator and former host of the nationally syndicated talk radio show The Small Business Advocate Show, which focused on small business and entrepreneurship issues. He is the author of several books including, The 3rd Ingredient: The Journey of Analog Ethics into the World of Digital Fear and Greed, The Age of the Customer: Prepare for the Moment of Relevance, Three Minutes to Success, and Small Business Is Like a Bunch of Bananas.

Career
After more than 20 years as an employee/manager/executive of big businesses, including multi-year tenures with Sears and Xerox, Blasingame founded his consulting firm in 1989 to focus on supporting small business CEOs.

In 1997, Blasingame founded a media company, Small Business Network, Inc. (SBN).

The company's initial medium was radio as Blasingame began broadcasting his nationally syndicated weekday radio program The Small Business Advocate Show, in November 1997. Two months later, in January 1998, he began simulcasting his program on the Internet. For over 23 years, Blasingame conducted over 1,000 live interviews annually with business experts on topics relevant to challenges and opportunities of 21st century small businesses. These live radio interviews resulted in the production of 10 separate Internet podcasts every weekday and 2,600 annually.

On November 19, 1999, Blasingame added another media channel, this time for his writing, with the launch of The Small Business Advocate Newsletter, which has been distributed every Sunday since its founding. In 2002, Blasingame published his first book Small Business is Like a Bunch of Bananas (SBN Books), and in 2006, his second book Three Minutes to Success (SBN Books), which have sold over 90,000 copies combined. His next two books have won numerous awards and sold approximately 100,000 copies each: The 3rd Ingredient: The Journey of Analog Ethics into the World of Digital Fear and Greed (SBN Books 2018) and The Age of the Customer: Prepare for the Moment of Relevance (SBN Books 2014). 

Blasingame is a syndicated newspaper columnist and is a contributing columnist to BizJournals.com, Forbes.com, NASDAQ.com, and American Express OPEN.com. His blog at JimsBlog.biz. He has made TV appearances on Fox Business and MSNBC, and has been quoted in such publications as Fortune Small Business, CNN, New York Enterprise Report, U.S. News & World Report and the Los Angeles Times.

Ideology
Blasingame's 1st Law of Small Business states, "It's easy to start a small business, but it's not easy to start and run a small business." His professional life is dedicated to those who employ over half of all private sector employees and generate over 60% of net new jobs. Blasingame writes and speaks on how small businesses can become vendor-partners with large businesses, and he teaches large businesses how to connect with and sell to small businesses.

Much of Blasingame's more recent work has focused on helping business understand that, in the Age of the Customer, relevance is more important to being competitive. And he's become a leading voice on converting the analog ethics we expect into digital ethics we can trust.

Awards and recognition
2018 Axiom Business Book Award Gold Medal for his fourth book, The 3rd Ingredient: The Journey of Analog Ethics into the World of Digital Fear and Greed

2018 International Book Awards for The 3rd Ingredient: The Journey of Analog Ethics into the World of Digital Fear and Greed

2014 Independent Book Publisher Award (IPPY) for his third book, The Age of the Customer: Prepare for the Moment of Relevance

2014 Axiom Business Book Awards, for The Age of the Customer: Prepare for the Moment of Relevance

2009 Champion of the Chamber Movement, American Chamber of Commerce Executives (ACCE)

2009 Champion of Small Business Development Award, Association of Small Business Development Centers 

2009 Small Business Advocate of the Year, New York Enterprise Report 

2006 University of North Alabama Alumnus of the Year

April 2005 Small Business & Entrepreneurship Council Small Business Advocate of the Month 

2002 Small Business Journalist of the Year, by the U.S. Small Business Administration 

2000 One of the 30 most influential small business experts, by FORTUNE Small Business magazine

Publications 

 Blasingame, Jim (2018) The 3rd Ingredient: The Journey of Analog Ethics into the World of Digital Fear and Greed. Alabama: SBN Books. p 314. ISBN 978-0-9709278-5-9

References

Living people
American male bloggers
American bloggers
American male writers
Year of birth missing (living people)
University of North Alabama alumni